Myra Kemble (17 November 1857 – 27 October 1906) was an Australian stage actress.

Life

Early life and career 
Myra Kemble was born on 17 November 1857 in Sligo, Ireland, to Pritchard and Teresa Joseph Gill . She emigrated to the Colony of Victoria when she was seven, and was educated at Geelong Convent School. In 1874, Kemble made her stage debut as Venus in a pantomime at the Theatre Royal, Melbourne titled Twinkle Twinkle Little Star. For some years she held the place of "leading lady" in various companies, and has been equally a favourite in all the cities of Australia and New Zealand.

Kemble's onstage debut was in around 1872–1873 at the Old Queen's Theatre in Sydney.

On 10 December 1878 Kemble married Mr James H. White (known as 'Eyeglass White'), a Sydney bookmaker, at St Mary's Cathedral in Sydney (following on from the earlier registration of their marriage at a registry office in Melbourne).

In 1890 Miss Kemble paid her first visit to England, when she purchased the colonial "rights" of Dr. Bill, by Charles Hamilton Aide, and other pieces. During her sojourn in London, Mr. Robert Buchanan wrote the play Man and the Woman especially for the popular colonial actress, who produced it at a matinée at the Criterion, where, however, despite excellent acting, it did not prove successful. After Miss Kemble's return to Sydney she made a brilliant reappearance at the Criterion Theatre in that city in Dr. Bill, and she toured the various colonies.

Kemble died in Melbourne, Victoria, Australia, on 27 October 1906.

Select theatre credits

New Magdalen
Queen Mary
Uncle Tom's Cabin
Pygmalion and Galatea
Hamlet (1877)
King Lear (1877)
The Woman in White (1878)
Arrah-na-Pogue (1878, 1880)
The Heir at Law
In Chancery
Hans, the Boatman
East Lynne (1880)
The New Babylon (1880)
Youth (1885)
Sophia (1888, 1889)
Dr Bill (1890, 1891)
Moths

External links
Images of Myra Kemble at State Library Victoria.

References

1857 births
1906 deaths
Irish emigrants to colonial Australia
Actresses from Melbourne
19th-century Australian women
20th-century Australian women
People from Sligo (town)